Chama Valley Independent School District 19 (CVISD), also known as Chama Valley Independent Schools, is a school district headquartered on the property of Escalante Middle/High School in Tierra Amarilla, New Mexico.

Its boundary includes Tierra Amarilla, Brazos, Canjilon, Chama, Ensenada, and Los Ojos.

History
Anthony Casados became the superintendent in 2010.

Schools
Escalante Middle/High School - Tierra Amarilla
The American football stadium, with a cost of $2,600,000, was built in 2015.
Chama Middle/Elementary School (K-8 school) - Chama
Tierra Amarilla Elementary School - Tierra Amarilla

Previously Escalante High School and Tierra Amarilla Middle School were two separate institutions.

References

External links
 Chama Valley Independent Schools
School districts in New Mexico
Education in Rio Arriba County, New Mexico